Deadly Groundz is the debut and only studio album by American hip hop group 5th Ward Juvenilez. It was released on June 20, 1995 through Underground/Rap-A-Lot Records. Recording sessions took place at Digital Services in Houston. Production was handled by Mike Dean, N.O. Joe, Crazy C, Derek "Grizz" Edwards, and O.G. Dewey, who was also serving as executive producer together with J. Prince. It features guest appearances from E-Rock, Kaos and 007.

The album reached number 200 on the Billboard 200 albums chart. It also peaked at number 28 on the Top R&B Albums and number 9 on the Heatseekers Albums. It spawned one single, "G-Groove", which sampled The Blackbyrds' "Mysterious Vybes".

In 1998, members Mr. Slimm and Nickelboy changed their rap names to Frank Nitti and Gotti and released a studio album Organized Crime as FWC (Fifth Ward Circle).

Track listing

Personnel
Daddy Lo – main performer
Frank "Mr. Slimm" Robinson – main performer
Nickelboy – main performer
Eric "E-Rock" Taylor – featured performer (track 13)
Kaos – featured performer (track 13)
Andre "007" Barnes – featured performer (track 13)
Michael George Dean – producer, mixing, mastering, engineering
"O.G. Dewey" Forker – producer, executive producer
Derek "Grizz" Edwards – producer
Simon "Crazy C" Cullins – producer
Joseph "N.O. Joe" Johnson – producer
John Marantz – mastering
James A. Smith – executive producer

Chart history

References

External links

1995 debut albums
Rap-A-Lot Records albums
5th Ward Juvenilez albums
Albums produced by N.O. Joe
Albums produced by Mike Dean (record producer)